Stadt Osnabrück (English: Osnabrück City) is an electoral constituency (German: Wahlkreis) represented in the Bundestag. It elects one member via first-past-the-post voting. Under the current constituency numbering system, it is designated as constituency 39. It is located in western Lower Saxony, comprising the independent city of Osnabrück.

Stadt Osnabrück was created for the inaugural 1949 federal election. Since 2021, it has been represented by Manuel Gava of the Social Democratic Party (SPD).

Geography
Stadt Osnabrück is located in western Lower Saxony. As of the 2021 federal election, it comprises the independent city of Osnabrück and the municipalities of Belm, Georgsmarienhütte, Hagen am Teutoburger Wald, Hasbergen, and Wallenhorst from the district of Osnabrück.

History
Stadt Osnabrück was created in 1949, then known as Osnabrück-Stadt und -Land. In the 1965 through 1983 elections, it was simply named Osnabrück. It acquired its current name in the 1987 election. In the inaugural Bundestag election, it was Lower Saxony constituency 6 in the numbering system. From 1953 through 1961, it was number 28. From 1965 through 1998, it was number 33. In the 2002 and 2005 elections, it was number 39. In the 2009 election, it was number 40. Since the 2013 election, it has been number 39.

Originally, the constituency comprised the independent city of Osnabrück and the entirety of the district of Osnabrück, which at the time was significantly smaller than its present area. In the 1980 election, it acquired its current borders.

Members
The constituency was first held by Anton Storch of the Christian Democratic Union (CDU), who served from 1949 until 1965. He was succeeded by fellow CDU member Ferdinand Erpenbeck. In 1972, Alfred Emmerlich of the Social Democratic Party (SPD) won the constituency. In 1976, Karl-Heinz Hornhues of the CDU was elected representative, but Emmerlich won again in 1980. Hornhues was against elected in 1983, and served until 1998. In 1998, Ernst Schwanhold of the SPD won the constituency. He was succeeded by fellow SPD member Martin Schwanholz in 2002. Mathias Middelberg of the CDU was elected in 2009, and re-elected in 2013 and 2017. Manuel Gava regained it for the SPD in 2021.

Election results

2021 election

2017 election

2013 election

2009 election

References

Federal electoral districts in Lower Saxony
1949 establishments in West Germany
Constituencies established in 1949